A Benefit year is the year in which National Insurance Contributory benefits are paid in the United Kingdom.  It runs from the first Sunday in January until the Saturday before the first Sunday in January.  It is different from a UK tax year.

References

Social security in the United Kingdom